Valor is an American military drama television series created by Kyle Jarrow. The show was produced by CBS Television Studios and Warner Bros. Television, with Anna Fricke and Kyle Jarrow serving as showrunners. The series premiered on The CW on October 9, 2017, as part of the 2017–18 U.S. television season. In November 2017, The CW announced that it would not be ordering any additional episodes of the show beyond the 13 episodes already produced. On May 8, 2018, The CW cancelled Valor after one season.

Cast and characters

Main
 Christina Ochoa as Chief Warrant Officer 3 Nora Madani, CPT Leland Gallo's co-pilot and one of the first females to ever serve in the Special Operations community.  Before joining the 186th Special Operations Aviation Regiment, CWO3 Madani served with the 101st Airborne Division in Afghanistan.  In the pilot, she was awarded the Distinguished Flying Cross with "V" device for valor. Subsequent to her injuries suffered in a helicopter crash, she has become addicted to prescription painkillers.  CWO3 Madani enlisted in the Army 10 years ago at the age of 18; three years prior to the series, she was a Chief Warrant Officer 2 in training at the United States Army Air Assault School.  In "Costs of War" both Madani and Gallo are discharged from the Army after coming clean about the cover-up they participated in for the events in the pilot and are almost immediately hired by Thea to fly for the CIA.  
 Matt Barr as Captain Leland Gallo, Pilot-in-Command with the fictional 186th Special Operations Aviation Regiment "Shadow Raiders" (based on the real life 160th Special Operations Aviation Regiment (Airborne)).  In the pilot, he was awarded the Distinguished Flying Cross with "V" device for valor.  In "Costs of War" both Gallo and Madani are discharged from the Army after coming clean about the cover-up they participated in for the events in the pilot and are almost immediately hired by Thea to fly for the CIA.  
 Charlie Barnett as First Lieutenant Ian Porter, an intelligence officer with the 186th Special Operations Aviation Regiment and the boyfriend of CWO3 Nora Madani.  The two of them transferred from the 101st Airborne Division together.  Three years prior to the series, he was a second lieutenant assigned to the Air Assault School. 1LT Porter is a graduate of the United States Military Academy at West Point.
 W. Trè Davis as Staff Sergeant Jimmy Kam, CPT Gallo's and CWO3 Madani's crew chief who was taken as a prisoner of war in the pilot.  He is rescued in "Oscar Mike" by the Shadow Raiders and returns home in "Costs of War" with posttraumatic stress disorder.
 Corbin Reid as Jess Kam, the wife of SSG Jimmy Kam and close friend of CWO3 Nora Madani.
 Nigel Thatch as Colonel Robert Haskins, a 23-year veteran of the United States Army who is serving as the Commanding Officer of the 186th Special Operations Aviation Regiment.  In the pilot, it is mentioned that he earned the Silver Star in Fallujah.
 Melissa Roxburgh as Thea, a member of the Central Intelligence Agency.  In her personal life, Thea has had short-term relationships with both SSG Zoe Cho and CPT Leland Gallo.  After she and the 186th Special Operations Aviation Regiment discover and expose her boss, Director Tucker Magnus, as a rogue agent in "Costs of War", she is given his post as Director of the CIA Special Activities Division.

Recurring and guest
 Zeeko Zaki as Staff Sergeant Matt Darzi
 Valarie Pettiford as Congresswoman Simone Porter, the Chairwoman of the United States House Permanent Select Committee on Intelligence and widowed mother of 1LT Ian Porter.  She is the point person for Washington in the Shadow Raiders' search for prisoners of war Sergeants Kam and Hendrix. She is later revealed as "Snake Eyes", the leader of the plot to sell uranium to Ukrainian terrorists. 
 Bryan Craig as Staff Sergeant Adam Coogan, a Delta Force operator and longtime rival of CPT Gallo; the two of them started their careers together before going their separate ways (Gallo became an officer and helicopter pilot, Coogan joined Delta Force). It was later revealed the two feuded over a woman which created animosity between the two. 
 Mac Brandt as Sergeant Shane Dylan Hendrix, a member of Delta Force and fellow prisoner of war alongside Staff Sergeant Jimmy Kam. Sergeant Hendrix is killed trying to escape imprisonment. 
 Chelle Ramos as Staff Sergeant Zoe Cho, one of the first females to ever serve in the Special Operations community.  After SSG Kam is taken as a prisoner of war, SSG Cho becomes CPT Gallo's and CWO3 Madani's crew chief.  In "About-Face", SSG Cho is sexually assaulted by a Delta Force operator, but manages to fight him off; the operator was immediately transferred off the base and Cho opted to file charges against him.

Episodes

Production

Development
The CW officially ordered Valor to series on May 10, 2017. The series was planned to air weekly on Netflix in the UK and Ireland beginning November 1, however it never arrived.

Casting
On February 17, 2017, Matt Barr was cast in the lead role as Captain Leland Gallo, a commanding officer and described as "an aging hipster meets flyboy", followed a month later by the casting of Christina Ochoa as his co-pilot Officer Nora Madani, "an intense and driven junior Army pilot who is a member of the Shadow Raiders special ops unit".

Filming
Filming for the series took place in Atlanta.

Reception

Ratings

Critical response
The review aggregator website Rotten Tomatoes reported a 24% approval rating with an average rating of 4.69/10 based on 17 reviews. The website's consensus reads, "Valors attempt to highlight an often overlooked segment of the armed services is undercut by a badly judged blend of military action and melodrama." Metacritic, which uses a weighted average, assigned a score of 39 out of 100 based on 10 critics, indicating "generally unfavorable reviews".

References

External links
 
 

2010s American drama television series
2017 American television series debuts
2018 American television series endings
The CW original programming
English-language television shows
American military television series
Television series by CBS Studios
Television series by Warner Bros. Television Studios
Television shows filmed in Atlanta